Memento Mori is the second studio album by American rock band Flyleaf, released through A&M/Octone Records on November 10, 2009.  The title is a Latin phrase meaning "be mindful of death" or "remember you will die". Memento Mori debuted at number eight on the Billboard 200, selling 56,000 units in its opening week. It also became the first album by a female-led act to top the Billboard Hard Rock Albums chart. The album sold more than 311,600 copies in the U.S. in a little over one year.

Background 
Memento Mori is the follow-up to their 2005 platinum debut. It contains 14 songs, which were selected out of 18 already written. The band reunited with producer Howard Benson to make the album. The album was recorded at Bay7 Studios in Los Angeles, California. It was released on November 10, 2009. The band debuted two songs, "Chasm" and "Circle", from Memento Mori live during a small acoustic tour in Afghanistan for United States Troops.

Writing 
The band began writing new music after their debut album was released. Most of the material was written while the band toured, but some songs date back as early as 2005 and 2006. "In The Dark" was written after the band released Flyleaf, though it was never played live. "Again", "Have We Lost", and "Beautiful Bride" were the first songs to be played live before they were released on the album.

"Again", the first single from Memento Mori, was released to radio and digital retail stores August 25, 2009. Meiert Avis directed the music video for "Again", released at midnight September 30, 2009, on MTV. Don Tyler directed the music video for "Beautiful Bride", released October 6, 2009. Diane Martel directed the music video for "Missing", released March 18, 2010. Giles Timms directed, animated and illustrated the animated viral music video for "Chasm", released on September 22, 2010.

The album premiered on the official Flyleaf MySpace page November 6, 2009.

Promotion 
The group, starting on September 28, held VIP listening parties throughout the country inviting fans to be the first to hear a selection of songs from the new record and view brand new music videos before they aired nationwide. By partnering with Eventful, fans were given the opportunity to demand that their city get routed into the "Road To Memento Mori" using Eventful's "Demand It!" service. Based on overwhelming demand, there were eight events.

Fans could see Lacey Sturm, Sameer Bhattacharya and Jared Hartmann, who made special appearances at these intimate gatherings across the country.

Reception 

Memento Mori currently holds generally favorable reviews on Metacritic with a 69.

Track listing

Bonus tracks

Track notes 
 "Tiny Heart" is a re-worked demo of a song that was written in the mid-2000s, before the release of Flyleaf's debut album.
 "Again" and "Have We Lost" were written in 2007 and often performed live. These songs underwent lyrical changes during the Memento Mori sessions.
 "Uncle Bobby" is a hidden track that is placed before "Beautiful Bride". The song can be heard by rewinding the disc to -4:28. On digital versions of the album, the song is track 15, after "Arise".
 "Set Apart This Dream" was inspired by the best-selling, inspirational John Eldredge book Wild at Heart.
 "Treasure" was written about Lacey's engagement to Joshua Sturm.
 The expanded edition bonus track "Enemy" was used during the opening segment of the season 5 Criminal Minds episode "Risky Business".

Charts

Weekly charts

Year-end charts

Awards 

The album was nominated for a Dove Award for Rock Album of the Year at the 42nd GMA Dove Awards.

Personnel 

Band
 Lacey Sturm – lead vocals
 Sameer Bhattacharya – lead guitar
 Jared Hartmann – rhythm guitar
 James Culpepper – drums, percussion, timpani, and wind chimes
 Pat Seals – bass, cover art

Production
 Howard Benson - producer, keyboards
 Chris Lord-Alge -  mixing
 Dave McNair - mastering

References 

2009 albums
Flyleaf (band) albums
Albums produced by Howard Benson
A&M Octone Records albums